The Pearson Cup was an annual midseason Major League Baseball rivalry between former Canadian rivals, the Toronto Blue Jays and Montreal Expos. Named after former Prime Minister Lester B. Pearson, it was originally created to raise money for minor league baseball in Canada. In later years, it was incorporated into the interleague baseball schedule.

The series began in 1978, and ran until 1986. Due to a strike, no game was played in 1981. In 2003, the series was revived as part of the Blue Jays–Expos interleague rivalry. It continued on into the 2004 season, after which the Expos moved to Washington, D.C. and became the Washington Nationals. The cup is now on display in the Canadian Baseball Hall of Fame in St. Marys, Ontario.

Results
From 1978 to 1986, the Cup was awarded after a one-game exhibition, that had no effect on the major league standings. The 1979 and 1985 games were abandoned as ties due to time constraints; in 1979 the Expos had to catch an airplane flight, while in 1985 the Jays had to catch a flight.

The game was suspended in 1987 as the two teams could not find a mutually agreeable date to play the game.  There was discussion about reviving the game in the preseason, or playing it in another Canadian city such as Vancouver, but this never took place.

During the 2003 and 2004 series, the Cup was awarded after a six-game set, three in Toronto and three in Montreal. These games counted in major-league standings and were played during the regular season.

The All-Canadian Series

The Blue Jays and Expos first played meaningful baseball in the  season with the introduction of interleague play. The series was a decided boost to the paltry attendance numbers at Olympic Stadium in Montreal, and gave a modest increase in attendance at SkyDome in Toronto; it failed, however, to become a serious rivalry amongst the players or the fans. Some people attribute this to a lack of Canadian players on both teams, while others point to the general discontent of Canadians with Major League Baseball during the late 1990s and early 2000s.

Major League Baseball put the final nail in the Series' coffin by playing the final set between the Jays and Expos in San Juan, Puerto Rico instead of Montreal. Major League Baseball's intention to boost attendance by playing in San Juan ended up resulting in lower attendance than the series had attracted in Montreal a year earlier.

The All-Canadian Series ended after  when the Expos were relocated and became known as the Washington Nationals. The Blue Jays won the series 24 games to 19 games, and Toronto also won the most season series (3–2–2).

List of games

2005 season
 
When the Expos moved to Washington, D.C. to become the Washington Nationals for the 2005 season, Major League Baseball identified the Baltimore Orioles as the Nationals′ "natural rival" for interleague play. However, the 2005 schedule already had been set, so during their 2005 season the Nationals played what would have been Montreal's schedule, which included six games against Toronto, three of them in each city. These games would have been the next All-Canadian Series games if the Expos had remained in Montreal for the 2005 season. The Blue Jays and Nationals went 3–3 against one another in the games in 2005. In 2006, Washington began annual interleague play against Baltimore in what became known as the "Beltway Series," while Toronto began play against its new interleague "natural rivals," the Atlanta Braves in odd-numbered years and the Philadelphia Phillies in even-numbered years.

Neutral-site games
The Blue Jays played a number of exhibition games at BC Place in Vancouver including three-game series against the Milwaukee Brewers prior to both the 1984 and 1985 seasons (the Vancouver Canadians were the AAA farm team of the Brewers at the time), as well as single games against the Detroit Tigers and Brewers in 1993 and against the Montreal Expos and Seattle Mariners in 1994 in a series billed as the "Baseball Classic".  The Jays also played the Cleveland Indians in an exhibition game at War Memorial Stadium in nearby Buffalo, New York in 1987.  More recently, the club has hosted a pair of exhibition games at Olympic Stadium in Montreal prior to the start of the season against the New York Mets (2014), Cincinnati Reds (2015), Boston Red Sox (2016), Pittsburgh Pirates (2017), St. Louis Cardinals (2018), Milwaukee Brewers (2019). A series against the New York Yankees was scheduled for 2020, but was cancelled due to the COVID-19 pandemic.

The club also has discussed playing more games at BC Place with the president of the Vancouver Canadians.

Notes
Canadian Bill Atkinson was the winning pitcher and scored the winning run for the Expos in the first-ever Pearson Cup game at the Olympic Stadium in 1978.
Pedro Martínez was the winning pitcher on June 30, 1997, in the first game of 'The All-Canadian Series', pitching 9 innings, striking out 10, walking one.

See also

 Interleague play
 Canadiens–Maple Leafs rivalry
 401 derby

References

External links
http://www.canadianbaseballnews.com/MonExpos/PearsonCup.html

Interleague play
Toronto Blue Jays
Montreal Expos
Baseball in Canada
Baseball trophies and awards
Canadian sports trophies and awards
Dissolved sports rivalries